The Battle of Miani (or Battle of Meeanee) was a battle between forces of the Bombay Army of the East India Company, under the command of Charles Napier and the Baluch army of Talpur Amirs of Sindh, led by Mir Nasir Khan Talpur. The battle took place on 17 February 1843 at Miani, Sindh, in what is now modern-day Pakistan. This battle and the subsequent Battle of Hyderabad (24 March 1843) eventually led to the capture of parts of Sindh region, first territorial possession by the East India Company in what is the modern-day state of Pakistan.

Background
According to Nadeem Wagan (a Sindh writer), the primary causes of the battle were the East India Company's desire to expand their possession in South Asia and General Charles Napier's ambitions. The General had held previous position as Governor of the Greek island of Kefalonia with very limited scope for glory. The Talpur kingdom of Sindh was inefficiently and loosely governed by the Amirs and a relatively easy target as opposed to the Sikh kingdom of the Punjab. Napier moved his army aggressively from the East India Company's Bombay Presidency area and entered the Sindh border. Negotiations ensued between the Talpur Amir in Hyderabad and Napier. An agreement was reached after the Amir gave significant concessions. Napier then started to move his army back towards Bombay and the Amir disbanded his army that had been mobilised. However, Napier was firmly determined in conquering Sindh and Hyderabad. While moving towards Bombay and giving the impression of keeping the agreement that had been reached, he suddenly turned back towards Hyderabad on the pretext of hostile intentions by the Amir and marched with great speed towards the capital.

In the book Janat ul Sindh, Pakistani author Rahimdad Khan Molai Shedai has written that:"On 16 February 1843 Sir Charles Napier came to Matiari from Hala. He was commanding 2800 soldiers with 12 cannons. On the other side Balouch army was consisted of 2200 soldiers with 15 cannons. Army of Sindh began to gather at the bank of Phuleli near Miani but there was no sufficient arrangements for providing ammunition to the army. English army consisted of soldiers belonging to Bombay, Pune and Madras. Charles Napier was commander and his subordinates were Capt. John Jackab, Capt. Hutt, Major Jackson, Lieut. Weddington, Major Penny Father, Lieut. Mac Merdo (Aide de camp of Napier), Major Wylie, Capt. Tucker, Lieut. Colonel Patel, Major Stori, Capt. Thomas, Major Machozison (Secretary of Napier), Capt. Wemus, Capt. Cookson, Lieut. Marston, Capt. Garrett were his subordinates. The Talpur army was composed of Shahdadani, Chakrani, and Khanani Talpurs.  Bijrani and Muhammadani Talpurs did not join. Mir Naseer had sent message to Malak Ibrahim Khan, the Sardar of Kalmati tribe to attack upon English army with the help of Nomri and Jokhiya tribes. The Kalmati Sardar left with band of 400 warriors but Jam Khan, Sardar of Jokhiya and Nomri tribes did not join him hence Ibrahim Khan went back to home. Mankani tribe also did not join. However Balochi tribes Nizamani, Bagrani, Mari, Jamali, Chang, Gopang, Jatoi, Qarai, Rind, Lashari, Bhurgri, and Chuulgri joined the army. In addition to Balouch tribes Khokhar, Khatiyan, Soomra, Khaskhali, and many others gathered under the banner of Sindh.  Sadaat of Sindh also joined the army with fervor of Jihad. Mir Jan Muhammad Khanani was commander of army.  His subordinates were Mir Ghulam Shah Shahwani, Syed Abdullah, Ibrahim Khan, Nawab Ahmed Khan Lighari, Ghulam Muhammad Lighari, Bakhtiyar Khan, Bahawal Khan Rind, Moro Khan Chang and Syed Fateh Muhammad Shah Lakiyari, who were warlords. Mir Ghulam Shah was Vice Commander. Hosh Muhammad Qambrani negro, Mashedi Irani and Mr Hawel were in charge of Talpur artillery.  The army of Meers' was seven times larger than English army but their weapons were imperfect as compare to the weapons of the rivals. English army was well trained but Talpur army was untrained and lacking discipline. The cannons of Meers' were three feet long and diameter of their muzzles was three inches. Their guns were breech-loaders of old times.  English soldiers, including local soldiers, were active and clever because of discipline having support of medical staff for providing first aid. Their army was supported by traveling band for providing ammunition and for digging tranches. Both armies were at the distance of 100 yards from each other. Mir Naseer Khan was wearing armor. Mir Rustam Khan, Mir Hussain Ali Khan and Mir Shahdad Khan were at his right and left sides. Both banks of Phuleli canal were covered by dense bushes which could be used for defense of the army. By that time Phuleli canal was dry and very wide. The chief of Chandia tribe was at some distance with 10000 warriors waiting and alert for the help of English army.On 17 February 1843 at early morning battle started".

Battle
The Baluch were forced to quickly re-mobilise their army but could not do so effectively as the army was mostly raised on a voluntary basis in times of war and most of the Baluch had returned home. Nevertheless, an army of around 8000—mostly cavalry—was raised and assembled at the battle ground of Miani. Disastrously for the Talpur Amirs another 8000 troops under Mir Sher Muhammad Talpur (later known as Sher-e-Sindh or "Lion of Sindh") failed to reach the battle ground in time. Napier had already successfully isolated the Amir of Khairpur (thereafter known as the great traitor by the Sindhi) by bribery and title. Thus the Baluchi army assembled at Miani represented approximately a third of the potential military strength in Sindh. Although the East India Company later gave its troops numbered in the battle as around 2800, contemporary Talpur records indicated the armies were approximately equal in numbers (around 8–10 thousand each) with the British having around 2500 European officers and soldiers and the balance being Indian sepoys.

The difference in military technology and tactics was enormous. The East India Company's army was led by professionally trained British officers and troops and the Indian Sepoys were also well trained and disciplined. They were armed with smoothbore percussion or flintlock Brown Bess muskets, which were accurate to 50–100 yards, and supported by modern artillery. In contrast, the Baluchi army consisted mostly of cavalry armed with muskets, spears and swords and some old artillery pieces acquired from Persia. The tactic was the favoured cavalry charge. Contemporary records indicate that the Baluchi army's morale was very high with the battle slogan being "we will die but not give up Sindh". Indeed, the Baluchis died in thousands, in four-to-five hours of carnage, the Baluchi horsemen charged in wave after wave and was mostly cut down long before they could reach British lines by rifle and artillery fire. When they did eventually reach British lines and, according to Napier himself in his book on the battle (Conquest of Sindh), he had to ride amongst his officers and troops to stop them from falling back in disarray in the face of the ferocity of the Baluch who had reached the British lines. Of the Baluch army of 8000 at Miani, around six thousand Baluch were killed. Reliable sources put the British casualties as 256 as kept by the East India company's paymasters while according to the Baluch, the Company's army suffered 3000 dead (although Napier gives a much lower casualty figure as he does for his total force). In famous book on history of Sindh 'Jannat ul Sindh' Molai Shedai writes that. "At the time of start of war at early morning at first one band of English army moved a head into the battle feild so that the hidden part of Talpur army might come out of the bushes". "At beginning Mir Jan Muhammad fought with stretegy and Charles Napier was sure of defeat. English cavalry bands attacked from right and left sides and Mir Jan Muhammad was [killed in action] and Mir Ghulam Shah took over the command. John Jackab leading 1000 cavalry attacked through the bed of Phuleli canal and at once moved back with deception and Talpur army thought it retreat and their lines stood broken and they followed the cavalry and reached across the banks of Phuleli where English artillery was staged at hidden place and English army opened the artillery upon them continuously for three hours. One cannonball hit against the [ammunition dump] of Talpur army which was completely [blown up]. After noon time one band of Ligharis was retreated then Thorha then Bahawal Khan ran from battlefield who was followed by Nawab Ahmed Lighari who also snatched the flag from Soomar before leaving the battlefield. Mir Naseer and Shahdad wanted to fight till last breath but their army was fleeing from battlefield .About 4000 were among them who left away without any order. One cannonball fall nearby and Suleman, personal servant of the Meer was [killed in action]. It appeared that army of Meers was under siege. Chang, Gopang, Mari and Nizamani were still fighting in battlefield. English army took control of the artillery of Meers due to support of one of in charge of the artillery who was Mr Hawel. At one moment Charles Napier came under attack but was saved by Lieut. Marston. At last moments Mir Hussain Ali Khan also ran away from battlefield. Looking to the situation Mir Naseer Khan also left the battlefield along with 1200 cavalry and came at the Fort of Hyderabad. During a three-hour face to face battle only 27 soldiers of English Army died and became injured. From officers Major Tezdil, Major Jackson, Capt. Maddy, Capt. Tieve, Capt. Cookson, Lieut. Wood died and Lieut. Penny Father, Major Welly, Capt. Tucker, Cap. Convey, Lieut. Harding and Feri became injured. About 20 British officers died and four officers from infantry were amongst them. About 5000 from Talpurs'army died. Mir Jan Muhammad Khan, Talha khan Nizamani, Ghulam Hussain khan Nizamani, Abdullah Khan, Ali Bungash, Gohar Khan Hajizai, Naseer Khan Chang, Mir Ghulam Shah, Mir Mubarak Khan Bihrani and others were among them. During 3 hours battle only one Irish soldier could stab bayonet at the chest of one Balouch soldier who was also killed by the other with sword as dead bodies of the both were found together. Capt. Postins in his book 'Personal observation of Sindh' while mentioning  about battle of  Miani wrote that' People of Sindh fought against the English army like persons who may fight for something which is more dearer to them than their lives'.

Later, on March 24, 1843, Mir Sher Muhammad Khan Talpur, reached Hyderabad with his private army of around 8,000 soldiers and tried to recapture Sindh from the East India Company forces. He sent Napier a message giving the General forty-eight hours to vacate the Hyderabad Fort. Napier who was firmly entrenched in Hyderabad Fort and had recently been reinforced from Bombay replied by firing his artillery from the fort walls. Mir Sher Muhammad Khan Talpur was subsequently defeated in the Battle of Dubba and thereafter he went to Punjab to seek help from Maharaja Ranjeet Singh, the Sikh ruler of the Punjab. The Maharaja extended hospitality but declined to become involved. Sher Muhammad Khan then went to the Khan of Kalat to seek assistance, but the Khanate of Kalat had already suffered a defeat by the East India Company in 1838 and was in no position to help. Eventually after 10 years, Mir Sher Muhammad returned to Sindh and surrendered to the East India Company administration, which gave him amnesty.

The amirs of Hyderabad were eventually exiled to Andaman Islands upon the conclusion of the conflict – never to see the city of Sindh again. Napier solidified Company control in Sindh after his victory at Miani. Fifteen years later when the Indian Rebellion of 1857 broke out, the conflict did not reach Singh and the region remained free from mutinies or battles.

The battle honours of "Meeanee" and "Hyderabad" are shared by the 22nd (Cheshire) Regiment and a number of Indian regiments, whereas that of "Scinde" is borne by the Cheshire Regiment alone.

Casualties

Five thousand Sindhis were killed or wounded in the battle. The fallen Amirs of Sindh consisted of Mir Nasir Khan Talpur, his nephews Mir Shadad Khan Talpur, Mir Hussein Ali Khan Talpur, Mir Sher Muhammad Talpur, the Subedar of Hyderabad, Mir Rustam Khan Talpur, Nasir Talpur, Wali Mohammad Khan Talpur of Khairpur. Others such as Mir Ali Murad Khan Talpur was taken aboard the sloop  and exiled to Burma.

A British journal said of the captive Sindhi Amirs: "The Amirs as being the prisoners of the state are maintained in strict seclusion; they are described as Broken-Hearted and Miserable men, maintaining much of the dignity of fallen greatness, and without any querulous or angry complainings at this unallevable source of sorrow, refusing to be comforted".

References
Notes

Bibliography
  Dispatches from Major-General Sir Charles Napier, KCB
  Dispatches from Major-General Sir Charles Napier, KCB

Miani
Miani 1843
History of Sindh
Military history of Sindh
February 1843 events
Talpur dynasty